The 1989 Men's Asian Basketball Confederation Championship was held in Beijing, PR China.

Draw

* Kuwait, Bahrain and Syria withdrew from the tournament, following this Indonesia moved to Group C to balance the number of teams in each group.

Preliminary round

Group A

Group B

Group C

Group D

Quarterfinal round

Group I

Group II

Group III

Group IV

Classification 5th–14th

13th place

11th place

9th place

7th place

5th place

Final round

Semifinals

3rd place

Final

Final standing

Awards

References
 Results
 archive.fiba.com

Asia Championship, 1989
Asia Championship, 1989
1989
B
September 1989 sports events in Asia